Surna Kahel (also Romanized as Sūrnā Kahel) is a village in Garmeh-ye Jonubi Rural District, in the Central District of Meyaneh County, East Azerbaijan Province, Iran. At the 2006 census, its population was 86, in 18 families.

References 

Populated places in Meyaneh County